Metrovía is a  rapid bus transit system developed in Guayaquil, Ecuador, and is now a widely used means of transportation in the city.

Line 1 was inaugurated on July 30, 2006. Line 2 was inaugurated on February 16, 2012. Line 3 was inaugurated on May 4, 2008. The system will consist of a total of 7 lines.

Metrovía Foundation 
Established by the city, with roughly 12 employees, this foundation is responsible for overseeing the entire operation. They plan future lines and ensure everything runs smoothly. Unlike other BRT Systems' administrative entities, this one is funded entirely from space rental and other non-fare related income.

Smart Cards

See also
 Trolebus of Quito
 TransMilenio of Bogotá
 Aerovia (Guayaquil)
 Line 1 of Metrovía
 Line 2 of Metrovía
 Line 3 of Metrovía

References

External links
BRT Policy Center
Municipality of Guayaquil (Spanish)